Mathieu Marien Ghislain Baudry (born 24 February 1988) is a French professional footballer who plays as a defender for EFL League Two club Swindon Town. He started his footballing career at the Le Havre academy, where his father was a player.

Career

Troyes
In January 2009, Troyes offered Baudry a contract extension to his current deal to tie him to the club until the summer of 2011. Although having only played 17 games for Troyes during his first season, Baudry was awarded 2008–09 Young Player of the Year and the club's 2008–09 Player's Player of the Year.

Baudry had a clause in his contract which allowed him to speak with other clubs following Troyes relegation to the third tier of French football. Before the 2009–10 season, a number of English clubs took an interest in taking him on trial. Baudry had a two-week trial with English club Leeds United. Baudry made his first performance in a friendly match for Leeds United in the 1–1 draw against Grimsby Town, excelling and winning praise from the Leeds manager. Simon Grayson said he was very impressed with Baudry's performance. Simon Grayson confirmed that Leeds were looking to sign Baudry providing the clubs agreed a fee.

Bournemouth
On 31 January 2011, Baudry joined English club Bournemouth in the League One along with striker Ben Williamson. He scored his first goal for the club in a 2–1 victory over Bristol Rovers. Baudry signed a new contract in the summer of 2011 to keep him at AFC Bournemouth. On 12 March 2012, Baudry joined Football League Two side Dagenham & Redbridge on a five-week loan.

Leyton Orient
On 28 June 2012, Baudry joined fellow League One club Leyton Orient on a two-year deal after his release by Bournemouth. The Frenchman signed along with Michael Symes who had also just been released by Bournemouth. Baudry scored his first league goal for Orient on 24 November 2012, heading in a Dean Cox cross in the 2–0 win over Preston North End at Brisbane Road.

On 4 August 2015 he was named the new Leyton Orient captain. In May 2016, he was released from Leyton Orient when it was announced that he would not be retained when his contract expired.

Doncaster Rovers
On 27 May 2016, Baudry signed for League Two club Doncaster Rovers, becoming Darren Ferguson's fourth summer signing at the Keepmoat Stadium. His first Doncaster goal was scored at Yeovil on 28 January 2017, the opening goal in a 0–3 victory, kicking the ball in from a free kick by Conor Grant.

Milton Keynes Dons
On 30 July 2018, Baudry joined newly relegated League Two club Milton Keynes Dons. He made his debut away to Crewe Alexandra on 18 August 2018 as an 82nd-minute substitute, but was sent off only seven minutes later for a late challenge. Following limited first team opportunities hampered by injury, Baudry was one of ten players released by the club at the end of the 2018–19 season.

Swindon Town
On 18 June 2019, Baudry joined League Two club Swindon Town on a free transfer effective from 1 July 2019 on a 1-year deal.

Career statistics

Honours
Troyes
Championnat National third-place promotion: 2009–10

Doncaster Rovers
EFL League Two third-place promotion: 2016–17

Swindon Town
EFL League Two: 2019–20
Individual
Troyes Player's Player of the Year: 2008–09
Troyes Young Player of the Year: 2008–09

References

External links

1988 births
Living people
Footballers from Le Havre
Association football defenders
French footballers
Ligue 2 players
ES Troyes AC players
AFC Bournemouth players
Dagenham & Redbridge F.C. players
Leyton Orient F.C. players
Doncaster Rovers F.C. players
Milton Keynes Dons F.C. players
Swindon Town F.C. players
English Football League players
French expatriate footballers
Expatriate footballers in England
French expatriate sportspeople in England